Ġ (minuscule: ġ) is a letter of the Latin script, formed from G with the addition of a dot above the letter.

Usage

Arabic
Ġ is used in some Arabic transliteration schemes, such as DIN 31635 and ISO 233, to represent the letter  (ġain).

In the Standard Tunisian Alphabet  Ġ is used in Tunisian Arabic to represent the voiced pharyngeal fricative . Whereas it uses Ğ to represent the voiced uvular fricative .

Armenian
Ġ is used in the romanization of Classical or Eastern Armenian to represent the letter  (ġat).

Chechen
Ġ  is present in the Chechen Latin alphabet, created in the 1990s. The Cyrillic equivalent is гI, which represents the sound .

Inupiat
Ġ is used in some dialects of Inupiat to represent the voiced uvular fricative .

Irish
Ġ was formerly used in Irish to represent the lenited form of G. The digraph gh is now used.

Maltese
Ġ is the 7th letter of the Maltese alphabet, preceded by F and followed by G. It represents the voiced postalveolar affricate .

Old Czech
 is sometimes (about 16th century) used to represent real , to distinguish it from the letter g which represented the consonant .

Old English
The digraph  was also used to represent .

Ukrainian
 is used in some Ukrainian transliteration schemes, mainly ISO 9:1995, as the letter Ґ.

Phonetic transcription

Computer encoding
ISO 8859-3 (Latin-3) includes Ġ at D5 and ġ at F5 for use in Maltese, and ISO 8859-14 (Latin-8) includes Ġ at B2 and ġ at B3 for use in Irish.

Precomposed characters for Ġ and ġ have been present in Unicode since version 1.0. As part of WGL4, it can be expected to display correctly on most computer systems.

OpenAI's GPT-2 uses 0xC4 0xA0 (Ġ) as the start of a word in its tokens.

References

Latin letters with diacritics
Phonetic transcription symbols
Maltese language